Louis-Bertrand Tirilly (born in 1912 in Guivinec) was a French clergyman and bishop for the Roman Catholic Diocese of Taiohae. He was appointed bishop in 1953. He died in 2002.

References 

1912 births
2002 deaths
French Roman Catholic bishops
Roman Catholic bishops of Taiohae